Osbourne may refer to:
 Osbourne (name), including a list of people with the name
 The Osbournes, a reality television program featuring Ozzy Osbourne and family
 Osbournes Reloaded, a variety television program also featuring the Osbourne family
 Osborne House, a former royal residence in East Cowes, Isle of Wight, United Kingdom
 Osbourne Canyon Formation, a geologic formation in California

See also
 Osborn (disambiguation)
 Osborne (disambiguation) 
 Osbern (disambiguation)